The Employer is a psychological thriller written and directed by Frank Merle. The film stars Malcolm McDowell as the title character who interviews five candidates for a job at a mysterious, powerful corporation. After a film festival circuit in early 2013, the film was released by Vision Films in the U.S. on June 7, 2013 as an On Demand premiere title, followed by a DVD release on July 2, 2013.

Plot
Five highly qualified applicants for a position with the mysterious, powerful Carcharias Corporation wake up trapped together in a locked room without any hope of escape. After exchanging stories about how each of them had been sedated and abducted they receive a phone call from their interviewer, known only as The Employer, who informs them that they have to kill each other; only the last surviving candidate would get the job.

Cast
 Malcolm McDowell as The Employer
 David Dastmalchian as James
 Paige Howard as Sandra
 Michael DeLorenzo as Keith
 Matthew Willig as Mike
 Katerina Mikailenko as Billie
 Nicki Aycox as Maggie
 Billy Zane as Alan

Release
In October 2012, a near-completed version of film was screened at Shriekfest in Los Angeles, as an Official Opening Night Selection.

In December 2012, the film won the award for Best Thriller at the Illinois International Film Festival. In March 2013, the film won a Special Jury Award at the Geneva Film Festival.

Other festival appearances include the LA Indie Film Festival, and the Big Bear Horro-Fi Film Festival as a Special Invitation screening.

The film was released in the United States by Vision Films, a worldwide distributor of independent films, across all major On Demand platforms on June 7, 2013. A DVD release followed on July 2, 2013.

Reception
Early festival screenings received positive reviews. Hunter Johnson from LAHorror.com praised the film's "terrific performances," especially Malcolm McDowell, who he noted is "even more dementedly charming than usual" in a film that's "modern, violent and full of nasty twists." Leo Brady from AMovieGuy.com called the film "an intriguing concept and thrilling to watch," stating that McDowell is "the perfect actor for this film. He has mystery behind his eyes and his portrayal of power is calm and cool." Sean Brickley from Horror News Network gave the film five stars and called McDowell's title character "the most sociopathic Human Relations director the corporate world has ever seen." Christopher M. Jimenez from Sinful Celluloid highly recommended the film, writing "Frank Merle has created a minor masterpiece with spot on performances, great manipulation, and good backstory." Sufi Mohamed from IndieJudge.com gave the film five stars, declaring in his review "this is literally one of the best independent movies I’ve ever seen," as he drew a real-world comparison between the film's themes and the Milgram Experiment.

On May 25, 2013, The Employer won eight honors at the Los Angeles Movie Awards, including Best Narrative Feature, Best Director, Best Actor (Malcolm McDowell), Best Supporting Actor (Michael DeLorenzo), Best Supporting Actress (Paige Howard), Best Original Score, Best Special Effects and the Audience Choice Award.

References

External links
 Official website
 The Employer at the Internet Movie Database

2013 films
2010s English-language films